Rough Riding Rhythm is a 1938 American Western film directed by J. P. McGowan and written by Arthur Everett. The film stars Kermit Maynard, Beryl Wallace, Ralph Peters, Olin Francis, Betty Mack, Curley Dresden and Cliff Parkinson. The film was released on August 15, 1937, by Ambassador Pictures.

Plot
Jim and Scrubby visit Scrubby's sister and find her dead. They suspect that murderer is her husband Jake, but they are arrested instead.

Cast          
Kermit Maynard as Jim Langley
Beryl Wallace as Helen Hobart
Ralph Peters as Scrubby
Olin Francis as Jake Horne
Betty Mack as Ethyl Horne
Curley Dresden as Soapy Phillips 
Cliff Parkinson as Hank 
Dave O'Brien as Detective Waters 
Newt Kirby as Detective Thomas

References

External links
 

1937 films
American Western (genre) films
1937 Western (genre) films
Films directed by J. P. McGowan
Films based on works by James Oliver Curwood
American black-and-white films
1930s English-language films
1930s American films